The Peru women's national under-20 volleyball team represents Peru in women's under-20 volleyball events, it is controlled and managed by the Peruvian Volleyball Federation that is a member of South American volleyball body Confederación Sudamericana de Voleibol (CSV) and the international volleyball body government the Fédération Internationale de Volleyball (FIVB).

Results

FIVB U20 World Championship

 Champions   Runners up   Third place   Fourth place

South America U20 Championship

 Champions   Runners up   Third place   Fourth place

Pan-American U20 Cup
 Champions   Runners up   Third place   Fourth place

Team

Current squad
As of July 2022

 Coach:  Walter Lung 
 Assistant Coach:  Elena Keldivekova

Notable players
Angela Leyva
Maguilaura Frias
Vivian Baella
Daniela Uribe
Andrea Urrutia
Shiamara Almeida
Rosa Valiente
Cristina Cuba
Violeta Delgado

References

External links
 ViveVoley.com

Volleyball
National women's under-20 volleyball teams
Volleyball in Peru